The Football League Youth Alliance is a youth football competition in England, consisting of four regional divisions. It acts as League 2 of the U18 Professional Development League system.

Current structure

North West Conference
 Accrington Stanley
 Blackpool
 Bolton Wanderers
 Carlisle United
 Fleetwood Town
 Morecambe
 Oldham Athletic
 Port Vale
 Preston North End
 Rochdale
 Salford City
 Shrewsbury Town
 Stockport County
 Walsall

North East Conference
 Bradford City
 Burton Albion
 Doncaster Rovers
 Grimsby Town
 Harrogate Town
 Hartlepool United
 Huddersfield Town
 Lincoln City
 Mansfield Town
 Rotherham United
 Scunthorpe United

South West Conference
 AFC Bournemouth
 Bristol Rovers
 Cheltenham Town
 Exeter City
 Forest Green Rovers
 Newport County
 Oxford United
 Plymouth Argyle
 Portsmouth
 Swindon Town

South East Conference
 Brentford
 Cambridge United
 Gillingham
 Leyton Orient
 Luton Town
 MK Dons
 Northampton Town
 Southend United
 Stevenage
 Sutton United
 AFC Wimbledon

Recent champions

Youth Alliance Cup 
The Youth Alliance also operates a cup competition known as the Football League Youth Alliance Cup.

Winners

See also
Premier Academy League
FA Youth Cup
The Central League
The Football Combination
The Football League
The Football Conference Youth Alliance

References

External links
Official page on the EFL website

Youth Alliance
Youth football leagues in England
Reserve football leagues in England
Youth football in Wales
Recurring sporting events established in 1997
1997 establishments in England